The 11th (East Africa) Infantry Division was a British Empire colonial unit formed in February 1943 during the Second World War.

Formation
In 1943, the 11th (East Africa) Division was formed primarily of troops from British East Africa. The division should not be confused with the earlier 11th (African) Division which was composed of brigades both from British East Africa and from Nigeria in British West Africa, fought in the East African Campaign and was disbanded in late 1941.

Combat history

The Division was composed of troops from Kenya, Uganda, Nyasaland, Tanganyika, Southern Rhodesia, Northern Rhodesia, and from Belgian Congo. The 11th (East Africa) Division fought with the Fourteenth Army in Burma during the Burma Campaign. In the later part of 1944, the division pursued the Japanese retreating from Imphal down the Kabaw valley and established bridgeheads over the Chindwin River. In 1945, elements of the division played a part in the Battle of Meiktila and Mandalay.

Commanding officers
 Major-General Charles Christopher Fowkes (February 1943 – December 1944)
 Major-General Robert Mansergh (January 1945 – February 1945)
 Major-General William Alfred Dimoline (March 1945 – August 1945)

Order of battle

21st East African Brigade
Under Brig. J. F. Macnab:
 2nd (Nyasaland) Battalion, King's African Rifles
 4th (Uganda) Battalion, King's African Rifles
 1st Battalion, Nigeria Regiment
1st Battalion, Northern Rhodesia Regiment

25th East African Brigade
Under Brig. N. C. Hendricks:
 11th (Kenya) Battalion, King's African Rifles
 26th (Tanganyika) Battalion, King's African Rifles
 34th (Uganda) Battalion, King's African Rifles
1st Battalion, Rhodesia Regiment

26th East African Brigade
Under Brig. V. K. H. Channer (to 18 November 1944), and Brig. A. P. Walsh (from 18 November 1944):
 22nd (Nyasaland) Battalion, King's African Rifles
 36th (Tanganyika) Battalion, King's African Rifles
 44th (Uganda) Battalion, King's African Rifles
 1st Battalion, Rhodesian African Rifles (later 22nd East African Brigade, XV Indian Corps)

Divisional units
 5th Battalion, King's African Rifles (divisional reconnaissance unit)
 13th Battalion, King's African Rifles (HQ defence unit)
 10th Belgian Congo Casualty Clearing Station

Divisional artillery
Under CRA Brig. J. V. D. Radford:
 302nd East African Field Regiment
 303rd East African Field Regiment
 304th East African Field Regiment

Divisional engineers
 34th East African Field Company
 58th East African Field Company
 64th East African Field Company
 62nd East African Field Park Company

Divisional signals
 11th East African Divisional Signals

See also
 List of British Empire divisions in the Second World War
 Battle of Meiktila and Mandalay
 1st SA Infantry Division

References

External links
 British Military History - East Africa 1940 - 47
 Order of Battle for 11th East Africa Division 

11
11
Kenya in World War II
11
Military units and formations in Burma in World War II
Military units and formations established in 1943
Military units and formations disestablished in 1945